Zem menom láska (in English transcribed as "The Land with a Name Love") is a song by Marika Gombitová released on OPUS in 1984.

As all the tracks from the singer's fifth studio set №5 (produced by Peter Breiner), Zem menom láska was written by Gombitová in common with Kamil Peteraj as well. In 1985, the music video of the composition topped the annual Zlatý Triangel TV chart in Slovakia.

Official versions
"Zem menom láska" - Studio version, 1985
"Zem menom láska (Live)" - Live version, Nežná revolúcia, 1989

Credits and personnel
 Marika Gombitová - lead vocal, writer
 Peter Breiner - producer, piano, Fender Rhodes, SCI Pro-One, Roland Juno 60, Roland Vocoder, Yamaha DX7, strings conductor, arranger
 Ladislav Lučenič - bass electric guitar, Juno 60, ARP Oddysey
 Kamil Peteraj - lyrics
 Juraj Lehotský - trumpets
 Ľudovít Horský - trumpets
 Pavel Zajaček - trombone
 Tibor Mrázik - trombone
 Ľuboš Stankovský - Simmons drums
 Viliam Vaškovič programmer Roland Drums Computer TR 808,
 Ivan Minárik - programmer ARP Oddysey, SCI Pro-One, Roland Juno 60, Roland Vocoder, sound director, technical collaboration,
 Štefan Danko - responsible editor
 Juraj Filo - sound director

Awards

Triangel
Zlatý Triangel was an annual video chart also broadcast by the public television network Slovenská televízia from 1984 to 1997. The show, originally hosted by Tatiana Kulíšková and Pavol Juráň, and since November 1989 by Daniel Junas, awarded exclusively Slovak and Czech artists for the best videos released in a calendar year, similarly as the MTV music channel. Prior to that, its monthly editions called Triangel were held. In total, Gombitová won four annual charts (in 1985-86, 1988 and 1995).

References

General

Specific

External links 
 

1984 songs
Marika Gombitová songs
Songs written by Marika Gombitová
Songs written by Kamil Peteraj
Slovak-language songs